54 Welbeck Street is a grade II listed town house in Welbeck Street, in the City of Westminster, London. The house is dated 1896 and in free style pink terracotta "Jacobethan".

References

External links 

Grade II listed buildings in the City of Westminster
Grade II listed houses in London
Welbeck Street
Houses completed in 1896
1896 in London
Jacobean architecture in the United Kingdom